The Saticoy Southern Pacific Railroad Depot in Saticoy, California was built in 1887.

The depot was designated Ventura County Historic Landmark no. 176 in May 2016. It was listed on the National Register of Historic Places in 2018. Built by the Southern Pacific Railroad along the line that was being constructed from Los Angeles to Ventura in 1887. The original town of Saticoy was laid out near the new depot. Its name comes from the Chumash village of Sa’aqtik’oy.

References

Former Southern Pacific Railroad stations in California
National Register of Historic Places in Orange County, California
Buildings and structures completed in 1887
Railway stations in Ventura County, California
Railway stations in the United States opened in 1887
Railway stations on the National Register of Historic Places in California

External links
 Historical Marker Database web site